Alois Sterling Blackwell (born November 12, 1954) is a former American football running back in the National Football League for the Dallas Cowboys and Kansas City Chiefs. He played college football at the University of Houston.

Early years
Blackwell attended Cuero High School. As a sophomore, he contributed to the team making its first state final appearance. He accepted a football scholarship from the University of Houston. As a sophomore in 1975, he posted 64 carries (fourth on the team), 364 rushing yards (third on the team), a 5.7-yard average and 2 touchdowns.	

As a junior in 1976, he became the starter at running back, registering 151 carries for 934 yards (6.2-yard avg.) and 8 touchdowns. He posted four 100-yard rushing games and contributed to the team's Southwest Conference co-championship. In the 1977 Cotton Bowl, he rushed for 149 yards, 2 touchdowns, earned offensive MVP honors and contributed to a number 4 national ranking, which was the highest in school history.

As a senior in 1977, he tallied 213 carries for 1,169 yards (5.5-yard avg.), 7 receptions for 108 yards and 11 touchdowns. His 1,169 rushing yards were second in the SWC behind Earl Campbell and fifth best in school history. He also scored 11 touchdowns, while having six 100-yard rushing games.

He finished his college career with 2,467 rushing yards (fourth in school history), a 5.8-yard average and 21 touchdowns (third in school history). In 2010, he was inducted into the University of Houston Hall of Honor.

Professional career

Dallas Cowboys
Blackwell was selected by the Dallas Cowboys in the fourth round (110th overall) of the 1978 NFL Draft. As a rookie, he was the third-string running back behind Tony Dorsett and Preston Pearson. He mostly covered kickoffs and was considered one of the hardest hitters on special teams. He played in Super Bowl XII. 

In 1979, he was the third-string running back. On October 22, he was waived to make room for defensive end John Dutton.

Kansas City Chiefs
In April 1980, he signed with the Kansas City Chiefs as a free agent. He was placed on the injured reserve list on August 19.

Personal life
Blackwell worked in the Houston Department of Intercollegiate Athletics.  On January 12, 2001, he was hired as the Texas Southern University athletic director. On February 11, 2008, he was relieved of his duties.
Blackwell is also a member of Phi Beta Sigma fraternity. He helped charter the Zeta Zeta chapter at the University of Houston on April 6, 1974.

References

External links
Houston honors Cuero's Blackwell

1954 births
Living people
American football running backs
Dallas Cowboys players
Houston Cougars football players
Kansas City Chiefs players
Texas Southern Tigers athletic directors
People from Cuero, Texas
Players of American football from Texas